The Unimog 404, also called the Unimog S and Unimog 404 S, is a vehicle of the Unimog-series by Mercedes-Benz, produced in the Unimog plant in Gaggenau from 1955 to 1980. Marketed as Unimog U82, and later Unimog U110, 64,242 units of the two Unimog 404 types 404.0 and 404.1 were built, which makes the 404 the Unimog model with the highest production figure of all Unimogs. Unlike the Unimog 401, the 404 is rather a small 1.5-tonne-offroad-truck than an agricultural vehicle. In Germany, it was a common military vehicle and fire engine, 36,000 Unimog 404 were made for the Bundeswehr.

Two prototypes for the French army followed in 1954, the first 1,100 series production models were also purchased by the French army. Since the French army did not want the spare wheel to occupy space for soldiers on the bed, the Daimler-Benz engineers decided to build the Unimog 404 with a downswept frame so the spare wheel could be mounted underneath the bed. This constructional feature also allowed more torsional flexing and, therefore, improved the offroad capabilities of the Unimog. Later, the downswept frame became a key constructional feature for the following Unimog types.

At its introduction in 1955, the Unimog 404.1 was available as the  wheelbase model with the Otto engine M 180 producing . In 1956, the  wheelbase model of the 404.1 followed, available with the same engine. Both were sold as Unimog U82. The production of the U82 with the short wheelbase was stopped in 1971, while the long wheelbase model was built until 1980. Starting from 1971, the Unimog 404.0, sold as Unimog U110, was offered. It was fitted with the cab of the Unimog 406 and soon afterwards, with the model 404.012, it received the M 130 engine. However, only 1,791 404.0 were made. Also, 81 Unimog 404 were made with the diesel engine OM 615 for the Portuguese market.

Technical description 

Like other Unimogs, it has a ladder frame, two portal axles with reduction gears and coil springs with hydraulic shock absorbers for the rear and front axle. All four wheels and tyres have the same size and are fitted with hydraulic ATE drum brakes. The 404 is a rear-wheel-drive vehicle with switchable all-wheel-drive and additional differential locks.

A water-cooled straight-six Otto engine, type M 180 II-U, displacing  powers the 404.1. It is fitted with a Zenith 32 NDIX offroad-carburettor and transmits the torque to a fully synchronised manual Daimler-Benz-six-speed-gearbox with two additional reverse gears. As clutch, the Fichtel & Sachs K 16 Z single-disc-dry-clutch is used.

The 404 was available both with a standard closed two-door-cab and as a two-door-cabriolet with a convertible top. The 404.1 has a divided windscreen, while the 404.0 with the cab of the Unimog model 406 has a single windscreen. Only the standard cab models have side windows in the doors. Special purpose vehicles, such as fire engines, were also made with an extended four-door-cab.

Overview of the 404-series

Technical data

Bibliography 

Carl-Heinz Vogler: Typenatlas Unimog. Alle Unimog-Klassiker seit 1946 bis 1993. GeraMond, München 2015, S. 41 ff.

References 

Mercedes-Benz vehicles
Military trucks
Mercedes-Benz trucks